Nicolas Provost  (born 1969, Ronse, Belgium) is a Belgian filmmaker and visual artist who lives and works in New York and Brussels.

His works are in a number of collections, including The New Art Gallery Walsall and Birmingham Museum and Art Gallery, who share Storyteller (2010), SMAK Gent and the Royal Museums of Fine Arts of Belgium.

His short film Suspension received an honorable mention at the Sundance Film Festival in 2008. He has also exhibited at The San Francisco International Film Festival, CineVegas, The International Film Festival Rotterdam, The Viennale, and The Locarno Film Festival.

His first feature film, The Invader, premiered at the Venice Film Festival in 2011.

He has lived in Belgium and Norway, and as of 2013, resides in New York.

Filmography

Shorts 

Provost's short films include:

 
 
 
 
 
 
 
 
 
 
 
 
 
  – nominated for the European Film Academy Awards
  – competed at the Berlinale 2010
 
 
 
 
  – third prize ALCINE44 European Short Film Competition.

Features

References

External links 
 Website
 
 
 Interview with Filmmaker magazine, February 2012

1969 births
Date of birth missing (living people)
Living people
People from Ronse
Belgian film directors
People from New York (state)